Aramid fibers, short for aromatic polyamide, are a class of heat-resistant and strong synthetic fibers.  They are used in aerospace and military applications, for ballistic-rated body armor fabric and ballistic composites, in marine cordage, marine hull reinforcement, as an asbestos substitute, and in various lightweight consumer items ranging from phone cases to tennis rackets. 

The chain molecules in the fibers are highly oriented along the fiber axis. As a result, a higher proportion of the chemical bond contributes more to fiber strength than in many other synthetic fibers. Aramids have a very high melting point (>500 °C).

Common aramid brand names include Kevlar, Nomex, and Twaron.

Terminology and chemical structure

Aramid is a shortened form of aromatic polyamide. The term was introduced in 1972, accepted in 1974 by the  Federal Trade Commission of the USA as the name of a generic category of fiber distinct from nylon, and adopted by the International Standards Organisation in 1977.

Aromatic in the name refers to the presence of aromatic rings of six carbon atoms. In aramids these rings are connected via amide linkages each comprising a CO group attached to an NH group.

In order to meet the FTC definition of an aramid, at least 85% of these linkages must be attached to two aromatic rings.

Para-aramids and meta-aramids

Aramids are divided into two main types according to where the linkages attach to the rings. Numbering the carbon atoms sequentially around a ring, para-aramids have the linkages attached at positions 1 and 4, while meta-aramids have them at positions 1 and 3. That is, the attachment points are diametrically opposite each other in para-aramids, and two atoms apart in meta-aramids. The illustration thus shows a para-aramid.

History
Aromatic polyamides were first introduced in commercial applications in the early 1960s, with a meta-aramid fiber produced by DuPont as HT-1 and then under the trade name Nomex. This fiber, which handles similarly to normal textile apparel fibers, is characterized by its excellent resistance to heat, as it neither melts nor ignites in normal levels of oxygen. It is used extensively in the production of protective apparel, air filtration, thermal and electrical insulation, as well as a substitute for asbestos.

Meta-aramids are also produced in the Netherlands and Japan by Teijin Aramid under the trade name Teijinconex, in Korea by Toray under the trade name Arawin, in China by Yantai Tayho under the trade name New Star and by SRO Group under the trade name X-Fiper, and a variant of meta-aramid in France by Kermel under the trade name Kermel.

Based on earlier research by Monsanto Company and Bayer, para-aramid fiber with much higher tenacity and elastic modulus was also developed in the 1960s and 1970s by DuPont and AkzoNobel, both profiting from their knowledge of rayon, polyester and nylon processing. In 1973 DuPont was the first company to introduce a para-aramid fiber, calling it Kevlar; this remains one of the best-known para-aramids and/or aramids. 

In 1978, Akzo introduced a similar fiber with roughly the same chemical structure calling it Twaron. Due to earlier patents on the production process, Akzo and DuPont engaged in a patent dispute in the 1980s. Twaron subsequently came under the ownership of the Teijin Aramid Company. In 2011, Yantai Tayho introduced similar fiber which is called Taparan in China (see Production).

Para-aramids are used in many high-tech applications, such as aerospace and military applications, for "bullet-proof" body armor fabric.

Both meta-aramid and para-aramid fiber can be used to make aramid paper. Aramid paper is used as electrical insulation materials and construction materials to make honeycomb core. Dupont made aramid paper during the 1960s, calling it Nomex paper. Yantai Metastar Special Paper introduced an aramid paper in 2007, which is called metastar paper. Both Dupont and Yantai Metastar make meta-aramid and para-aramid paper.

Health
During the 1990s, an in vitro test of aramid fibers showed they exhibited "many of the same effects on epithelial cells as did asbestos, including increased radiolabeled nucleotide incorporation into DNA and induction of ODC (ornithine decarboxylase) enzyme activity", raising the possibility of carcinogenic implications.  However, in 2009, it was shown that inhaled aramid fibrils are shortened and quickly cleared from the body and pose little risk. A declaration of interest correction was later provided by the author of the study stating that "This review was commissioned and funded by DuPont and Teijin Aramid, but the author alone was responsible for the content and writing of the paper."

Production
World capacity of para-aramid production was estimated at about 41,000 tonnes per year in 2002 and increases each year by 5–10%. In 2007 this means a total production capacity of around 55,000 tonnes per year.

Polymer preparation
Aramids are generally prepared by the reaction between an amine group and a carboxylic acid halide group.  Simple AB homopolymers have the connectivity −(NH−C6H4−CO)n−.

Well-known aramid polymers such as Kevlar, Twaron, Nomex, New Star, and Teijinconex) are prepared from diamine and diacid (or equivalent) precursors. These polymers can be further classified according to the linkages on the aromatic subunits.  Nomex, Teijinconex, and New Star contain predominantly the meta-linkage.  They are called poly-metaphenylene isophthalamides (MPIAs). By contrast, Kevlar and Twaron both feature para-linkages. They are called  p-phenylene terephthalamides (PPTAs). PPTA is a product of p-phenylene diamine (PPD) and terephthaloyl dichloride (TDC or TCl).

Production of PPTA relies on a co-solvent with an ionic component (calcium chloride, CaCl2) to occupy the hydrogen bonds of the amide groups, and an organic component (N-methyl pyrrolidone, NMP) to dissolve the aromatic polymer. This process was invented by Leo Vollbracht at Akzo. Apart from the carcinogenic hexamethylphosphorous triamide (HMPT), still no practical alternative of dissolving the polymer is known. The use of the NMP/CaCl2 system led to an extended patent dispute between Akzo and DuPont.

Spinning
After production of the polymer, the aramid fiber is produced by spinning the dissolved polymer to a solid fiber from a liquid chemical blend.  Polymer solvent for spinning PPTA is generally 100% anhydrous sulfuric acid (H2SO4).

Appearances
 Fiber
 Chopped fiber
 Powder
 Pulp

Other types of aramids

Besides meta-aramids like Nomex, other variations belong to the aramid fiber range.  These are mainly of the copolyamide type, best known under the brand name Technora, as developed by Teijin and introduced in 1976.  The manufacturing process of Technora reacts PPD and 3,4'-diaminodiphenylether (3,4'-ODA) with terephthaloyl chloride (TCl).
This relatively simple process uses only one amide solvent, and therefore spinning can be done directly after the polymer production.

Aramid fiber characteristics
Aramids share a high degree of orientation with other fibers such as ultra-high-molecular-weight polyethylene, a characteristic that dominates their properties.

General
 good resistance to abrasion
 good resistance to organic solvents
 nonconductive
 very high melting point (>500 °C)
 low flammability
 good fabric integrity at elevated temperatures
 sensitive to acids and salts
 sensitive to ultraviolet radiation
 prone to electrostatic charge build-up unless finished

Para-aramids
 para-aramid fibers, such as Kevlar and Twaron, provide outstanding strength-to-weight properties
 high chord modulus
 high tenacity
 low creep
 low elongation at break (~3.5%)
 difficult to dye – usually solution-dyed

Uses
 flame-resistant clothing
 heat-protective clothing and helmets
 body armor, competing with polyethylene-based fiber products such as Dyneema and Spectra
 composite materials
 asbestos replacement (e.g. brake linings)
 hot air filtration fabrics
 tires, newly as Sulfron (sulfur-modified Twaron)
 mechanical rubber goods reinforcement
 ropes and cables
V-belts (automotive, machinery, equipment, and more)
 wicks for fire dancing
 optical fiber cable systems
 sail cloth (not necessarily racing boat sails)
 sporting goods
 drumheads
 wind instrument reeds, such as the Fibracell brand
 loudspeaker diaphragms
 boathull material
 fiber-reinforced concrete
 reinforced thermoplastic pipes
 tennis strings, e.g. by Ashaway and Prince tennis companies
 hockey sticks (normally in composition with such materials as wood and carbon)
 snowboards
 jet engine enclosures
 fishing reel drag systems
 asphalt reinforcement
 Prusiks for rock climbers (which slide along the main rope and can otherwise melt due to friction).

See also
Para-aramid
 Kevlar
 Technora
 Twaron
 Heracron

Meta-aramid
 Nomex
 Teijinconex

Others
 Innegra S
 Nylon
 Textile
 Ultra high molecular weight polyethylene
 Vectran

Notes and references

Further reading

 
 
 
 
 DuPont and Teijin to expand aramid production – September 2004

Synthetic fibers
Materials
Organic polymers
Polyamides
Body armor
Airship technology